Beatrice Sophia Steinfeld Levy (April 3, 1892 - July 19, 1974) was an American printmaker and painter, draftsman, and instructor.

Early life and education
She was born in Chicago to a German-Jewish emigrant father and a mother from Kentucky and grew up on Chicago's Near South Side.  She studied at the Chicago Art Institute after graduating from high school in 1910 with an initial focus on illustration.  While there, she was among a small number of students including Stanislaus Szukalski who defended the modernist works on display at the notorious Armory Show at the Art Institute in 1913.  Encouraged by her instructors she continued her art education after graduating in 1910 with honorable mention, studying portraiture with Ralph Clarkson in Chicago, painting with Charles Hawthorne in Provincetown, Massachusetts, and fine print methods with Vojtěch Preissig in New York's Art Students League in 1915.

Career
By then, she was already a prolific painter and printmaker, producing striking images with saturated color and abbreviated, semi-realist imagery. One of the earliest members of the Chicago Society of Etchers, her exacting, three-plate color intaglios were first exhibited by the Society in 1914. The same year, one of her prints received an honorable mention at Panama–Pacific International Exposition in San Francisco.

She held her first solo exhibition in 1916 at Goupil & Cie Gallery in New York, featured her entire collection of color aquatints. She had a studio in Chicago's 57th Street Art Colony.

In the 1920s she helped form an "art for art's sake" group called the Cor Ardens along with Szukalski, Carl Hoeckner, Ramon Shiva, and Gerrit Sinclair. Traveling with friends all over the United States, Europe, and Mexico, she was by then well-known for "forceful painting in oils, but also for her ability to express in the exquisite art of the copper plate … an individual style through a simple and dignified treatment of her subject matter." (Palos Journal, May 1929)

During the Great Depression (1929-39), Levy supervised the Easel Painting Division and Art Gallery of the Illinois Art Project of the WPA. She also supervised the Easel Painting Division for the Federal Arts Project a decade later.

For two years during World War II, Levy worked as a meteorological map draftsman and her subsequent work developed along more modern lines.

She traveled extensively in the US, Europe, and North Africa and summered La Jolla, California for several years before making it her home in 1950. She served on the board of the San Diego Museum of Art (then the San Diego Fine Arts Gallery) and taught at the La Jolla Museum School of Arts and Crafts (1961–62). Also at the time, she began a close relationship with the modernist artist Dorothy Stratton King, a La Jolla resident with whom she shared a passion for rich color and strong form.

Levy experimented heavily in her final decade in linear and highly abstract printmaking and enamels.

Levy never married. After a long and distinguished career, she died in La Jolla in 1974. Her papers are held by the Archives of American Art at the Smithsonian Institution in Washington, DC.

Leadership positions 
Chicago Society of Artists, president and board member  
Chicago Society of Etchers, vice president and board member   
Renaissance Society at the University of Chicago, board member 
Arts Club of Chicago, vice president and member  
Works Progress Administration Art Project Gallery, supervisor  
Easel Painting Division for the Federal Art Project, supervisor   
San Diego Museum of Art (then the San Diego Fine Arts Gallery), board member

Solo exhibitions 
1916 Goupil & Cie Gallery, New York  
1923 Milwaukee Art Institute, Wisconsin 
1924 Philadelphia Print Club, Pennsylvania 
1924 Art Club, Washington, DC 
1924 Godspeed's Gallery, Boston, Massachusetts 
1924 Grand Rapids Art Gallery, Grand Rapids, Michigan 
1926 Library of Congress, Washington, DC 
1929 Carnegie Institute, Museum of Art, Pittsburgh, PA 
1931 Art Institute of Chicago, Illinois 
1932 Smithsonian Institution, Washington, DC 
1933–34 Century of Progress, Chicago Art Institute, Illinois 
1934 John H Vanderpoel Gallery, Chicago, Illinois 
1948 Grinnel College, Iowa 
1955 La Jolla Art Center, San Diego, California 
1957 Jonson Gallery, University New Mexico 
1960 Long Beach Museum, California

Awards 
Pan Pacific Exposition, San Francisco, honorable mention (etching), 1915 
Robert Rice Jenkins Prize for Painting, Art Institute of Chicago, 1923 
Chicago Society of Artists Exhibition, gold medal, 1928 
International Exhibition of Prints, Art Institute of Chicago, etcher's prize, 1930 
American Artists, Art Institute of Chicago, honorable mention, 1930 
Illinois State Exhibition, purchase prize 
Coronado Artists Association, first prize, 1952, 1956, 1957 
Del Mar County Fair Art Show, first prize, 1953 
San Diego Fine Arts Guild, honorable mention, 1955 and 1957 
La Jolla Art Center, print award, 1957

Permanent collections 
Smithsonian Institution 
Bibliotéque National, Paris 
Art Institute of Chicago 
Library of Congress 
Chicago Municipal College 
Los Angeles County Museum of Art 
Spencer Museum of Art, University of Kansas 
National Gallery of Art, Washington D.C. 
Mobile Museum of Art, Alabama 
Long Beach Museum of Art 
University of New Mexico 
La Jolla Museum of Art 
Fine Arts Gallery of San Diego 
Davenport Municipal Art Gallery 
University of New Mexico 
Vanderpoel College

References 

Beatrice Levy at Conrad R. Graeber Fine Art

20th-century American painters
American printmakers
1892 births
1974 deaths